Cocoharpinia iliffei is a species of crustacean in the family Phoxocephalidae. It is endemic to Bermuda.

References

Gammaridea
Freshwater crustaceans of North America
Endemic fauna of Bermuda
Monotypic crustacean genera
Taxonomy articles created by Polbot